Gachibowli is a suburb of Hyderabad, Telangana, India, located in the Serilingampally mandal of the Rangareddy district. It is situated about 5 km away from HITEC City, another IT hub. Gachibowli is home to numerous tech companies and residential units. It has a vast area and is dotted with rocky surface and hillocks all around.

Etymology
The word ‘Gachi’ means lime mortar and ‘bowli’ comes from the word ‘baoli’ which means a well. Thus the area ‘Gachibowli’ is named after the presence of a well plastered with limestone. The Asaf Jahi period 200 year old Gachibowli Stepwell, next to Jama Masjid-E-Dilawarsha Begum, was revived and inaugurated in November 2021.

Gachibowli- ORR Junction
There are multi-level flyovers at the Outer Ring Road entrance at the Gachibowli Junction, which are constructed as part of Strategic Road Development Program (SRDP). As per 2022 traffic study conducted by the Greater Hyderabad Municipal Corporation (GHMC), the peak hour traffic at Gachibowli junction  stands at 9,806 PCU (Passenger Car Unit)/per hour. By 2036, the same junction is estimated to face a traffic of 17,711 PCU/hour. The four-lane bi-directional flyover from Shilpa Layout to the Outer Ring Road near Gachibowli Junction was inaugurated on 25 November 2022. This 823-metre-long, 16.60-metre-wide flyover has two twin steel girders. Some spans of this flyover are placed across the existing Gachibowli Crossroad Flyover. The 2.81-km long flyover at Shilpa Layout is the second longest four-lane bi-directional flyover in Hyderabad.

The construction of another six-lane bidirectional flyover in the direction of the Kondapur side towards ORR at the second level crossing, Gachibowli Junction is expected to complete by December 2023. This flyover will be 816 metres long and 24 metres wide.

Cityscape

Schools and Colleges

One campus of CHIREC International is situated in Gachibowli. The Gachibowli branch, which caters to students from Grades 1 through 3, was inaugurated in 2012. Kendriya Vidyalaya and Nasr Boys School (affiliated to CBSE) are also situated in Gachibowli. Maulana Azad National Urdu University is also located in Gachibowli. There is one off-campus of Tata Institute of Social Sciences, Hyderabad in Roda Mistry College of Social Work and Research Center, Gachibowli. Blue Blocks Pre School and National Institute of Tourism and Hospitality Management is also situated in Gachibowli.

See also
 List of flyovers and under-passes in Hyderabad
 Khajaguda
 List of tallest buildings in Hyderabad
 Financial District, Hyderabad

References 

Cities and towns in Ranga Reddy district
Neighbourhoods in Hyderabad, India
Ranga Reddy district